Philip IV (April–June 1268 – 29 November 1314), called Philip the Fair, was King of France from 1285 to 1314. By virtue of his marriage with Joan I of Navarre, he was also King of Navarre as Philip I from 1284 to 1305, as well as Count of Champagne. Although Philip was known to be handsome, hence the epithet le Bel, his rigid, autocratic, imposing, and inflexible personality gained him (from friend and foe alike) other nicknames, such as the Iron King. His fierce opponent Bernard Saisset, bishop of Pamiers, said of him: "He is neither man nor beast. He is a statue."

Philip, seeking to reduce the wealth and power of the nobility and clergy, relied instead on skillful civil servants, such as Guillaume de Nogaret and Enguerrand de Marigny, to govern the kingdom. The king, who sought an uncontested monarchy, compelled his upstart vassals by wars and restricted their feudal privileges, paving the way for the transformation of France from a feudal country to a centralized early modern state. Internationally, Philip’s ambitions made him highly influential in European affairs, and for much of his reign he sought to place his relatives on foreign thrones. Princes from his house ruled in Hungary, and he tried and failed to make another relative the Holy Roman Emperor.

The most notable conflicts of Philip's reign include a dispute with the English over King Edward I's fiefs in southwestern France, and a war with the County of Flanders, who had rebelled against French royal authority and humiliated Philip at the Battle of the Golden Spurs in 1302. The war with the Flemish resulted in Philip's ultimate victory, after which he received a significant portion of Flemish cities, which were added to the crown lands along with a vast sum of money. Domestically, his reign was marked by struggles with the Jews and the Knights Templar. In heavy debt to both groups, Philip saw them as a "state within the state" and a recurring threat to royal power. In 1306 Philip expelled the Jews from France, followed by the total destruction of the Knights Templar the next year in 1307. To further strengthen the monarchy, Philip tried to tax and take control of the French clergy, leading to a violent dispute with Pope Boniface VIII. The ensuing conflict saw the pope's residence at Anagni attacked in September 1303 by French forces with the support of the Colonna family. Boniface was captured and held hostage for a number of days. This eventually resulted in the transfer of the papal court to the  enclave of Avignon in 1309.

His final year saw a scandal amongst the royal family, known as the Tour de Nesle affair, in which Philip's three daughters-in-law were accused of adultery. His three sons were successively kings of France: Louis X, Philip V, and Charles IV. Their rapid successive deaths without surviving sons of their own would compromise the future of the French royal house, which had until then seemed secure, precipitating a succession crisis that would eventually lead to the Hundred Years' War (1337–1453).

Youth
A member of the House of Capet, Philip was born in 1268 in the medieval fortress of Fontainebleau (Seine-et-Marne) to the future Philip III, the Bold, and his first wife, Isabella of Aragon. His father was the heir apparent of France, being the eldest son of King Louis IX.

In August 1270, when Philip was two years old, his grandfather died while on Crusade, his father became king, and his elder brother Louis became heir apparent. Only five months later, in January 1271, Philip's mother died after falling from a horse; she was pregnant with her fifth child at the time and had not yet been crowned queen beside her husband. A few months later, one of Philip's younger brothers, Robert, also died. Philip's father was finally crowned king at Rheims on 15 August 1271. Six days later, he married again; Philip's step-mother was Marie, daughter of the duke of Brabant.

In May 1276, Philip's elder brother Louis died, and the eight year old Philip became heir apparent. It was suspected that Louis had been poisoned, and that his stepmother, Marie of Brabant, had instigated the murder. One reason for these rumours was the fact that the queen had given birth to her own first son the month Louis died. However, both Philip and his surviving full brother Charles lived well into adulthood and raised large families of their own.

The scholastic part of Philip's education was entrusted to Guillaume d'Ercuis, his father's almoner.

After the unsuccessful Aragonese Crusade against Peter III of Aragon, which ended in October 1285, Philip may have negotiated an agreement with Peter for the safe withdrawal of the Crusader army. This pact is attested to by Catalan chroniclers. Joseph Strayer points out that such a deal was probably unnecessary, as Peter had little to gain from provoking a battle with the withdrawing French or angering the young Philip, who had friendly relations with Aragon through his mother.

Philip married Queen Joan I of Navarre (1271–1305) on 16 August 1284. The two were affectionate and devoted to each other and Philip refused to remarry after Joan's death in 1305, despite the great political and financial rewards of doing so. The primary administrative benefit of the marriage was Joan's inheritance of Champagne and Brie, which were adjacent to the royal demesne in Ile-de-France, and thus effectively were united to the king's own lands, expanding his realm. The annexation of wealthy Champagne increased the royal revenues considerably, removed the autonomy of a large semi-independent fief and expanded royal territory eastward. Philip also gained Lyon for France in 1312.

Navarre remained in personal union with France, beginning in 1284 under Philip and Joan, for 44 years. The Kingdom of Navarre in the Pyrenees was poor but had a degree of strategic importance. When in 1328 the Capetian line went extinct, the new Valois king, Philip VI, attempted to permanently annex the lands to France, compensating the lawful claimant, Joan II of Navarre, senior heir of Philip IV, with lands elsewhere in France. However, pressure from Joan II's family led to Phillip VI surrendering the land to Joan in 1329, and the rulers of Navarre and France were again different individuals.

Reign
After marrying Joan I of Navarre, becoming Philip I of Navarre, Philip ascended the French throne at the age of 17. He was crowned on 6 January, in 1286 in Reims. As king, Philip was determined to strengthen the monarchy at any cost. He relied, more than any of his predecessors, on a professional bureaucracy of legalists. To the public he kept aloof, and left specific policies, especially unpopular ones, to his ministers; as such he was called a "useless owl" by his contemporaries, among them Bishop Saisset. His reign marks the transition in France from a charismatic monarchy – which could all but collapse in an incompetent reign – to a more bureaucratic kingdom, a move, under a certain historical reading, towards modernity.

Foreign policy and wars

War against England

As the Duke of Aquitaine, English King Edward I was a vassal to Philip, and had to pay him homage. Following the Fall of Acre in 1291, however, the former allies started to show dissent.

In 1293, following a naval incident between the English and the Normans, Philip summoned Edward to the French court. The English king sought to negotiate the matter via ambassadors sent to Paris, but they were turned away with a blunt refusal. Philip addressed Edward as a duke, a vassal and nothing more, despite the international implications of the relationship between England and France, and not an internal matter involving Philip's French vassals.

Edward next attempted to use family connections to achieve what open politics had not.  He sent his brother Edmund Crouchback, who was Philip's cousin as well as his step-father-in-law, in attempts to negotiate with the French royal family and avert war. Additionally, Edward had by that time become betrothed by proxy to Philip's sister Margaret, and, in the event of the negotiations being successful, Edmund was to escort Margaret back to England for her wedding to Edward.

An agreement was indeed reached; it stated that Edward would voluntarily relinquish Gascony to Philip as a sign of submission in his capacity as the duke of Aquitaine. In return, Philip would forgive Edward and restore Gascony after a grace period. In the matter of the marriage, Philip drove a hard bargain based partially on the difference in age between Edward and Margaret; it was agreed that the province of Gascony would be retained by Philip in return for agreeing to the marriage. The date of the wedding was also put off until the formality of sequestering and re-granting the French lands back to Edward was completed.

But Edward, Edmund and the English had been deceived. The French had no intention of returning the land to the English monarch. Edward kept up his part of the deal and turned over his continental estates to the French.  However, Philip used the pretext that the English king had refused his summons in order to strip Edward of all his possessions in France, thereby initiating hostilities with England.

The outbreak of hostilities with England in 1294 was the inevitable result of the competitive expansionist monarchies, triggered by a secret Franco-Scottish pact of mutual assistance against Edward I; inconclusive campaigns for the control of Gascony, southwest of France were fought 1294–1298 and 1300–1303. Philip gained Guienne but due to subsequent revolts was later forced to return it to Edward. The search for income to cover military expenditures set its stamp on Philip's reign and his reputation at the time.

Pursuant to the terms of the Treaty of Paris in 1303, the marriage of Philip's daughter Isabella to the Prince of Wales, Edward I's heir, celebrated at Boulogne, 25 January 1308,  was meant to seal a peace; instead it would produce an eventual English claimant to the French throne itself, and the Hundred Years' War.

War with Flanders
Philip suffered a major embarrassment when an army of 2,500 noble men-at-arms (knights and squires) and 4,000 infantry he sent to suppress an uprising in Flanders was defeated in the Battle of the Golden Spurs near Kortrijk on 11 July 1302. Philip reacted with energy to the humiliation and the Battle of Mons-en-Pévèle followed two years later, which ended in a decisive French victory. Consequently, in 1305, Philip forced the Flemish to accept a harsh peace treaty; the peace exacted heavy reparations and humiliating penalties, and added to the royal territory the rich cloth cities of Lille, Douai, and Bethune, sites of major cloth fairs. Béthune, first of the Flemish cities to yield, was granted to Mahaut, Countess of Artois, whose two daughters, to secure her fidelity, were married to Philip's two sons.

Crusades and diplomacy with Mongols

Philip had various contacts with the Mongol power in the Middle East, including reception at the embassy of the Uyghur monk Rabban Bar Sauma, originally from the Yuan dynasty of China. Bar Sauma presented an offer of a Franco-Mongol alliance with Arghun of the Mongol Ilkhanate in Baghdad. Arghun was seeking to join forces between the Mongols and the Europeans, against their common enemy the Muslim Mamluks. In return, Arghun offered to return Jerusalem to the Christians, once it was re-captured from the Muslims. Philip seemingly responded positively to the request of the embassy by sending one of his noblemen, Gobert de Helleville, to accompany Bar Sauma back to Mongol lands. There was further correspondence between Arghun and Philip in 1288 and 1289, outlining potential military cooperation. However, Philip never actually pursued such military plans.

In April 1305, the new Mongol ruler Öljaitü sent letters to Philip, the Pope, and Edward I of England. He again offered a military collaboration between the Christian nations of Europe and the Mongols against the Mamluks. European nations attempted another Crusade but were delayed, and it never took place. On 4 April 1312, another Crusade was promulgated at the Council of Vienne. In 1313, Philip "took the cross", making the vow to go on a Crusade in the Levant, thus responding to Pope Clement V's call. He was, however, warned against leaving by Enguerrand de Marigny and died soon after in a hunting accident.

Finance and religion

Mounting deficits
Under Philip IV, the annual ordinary revenues of the French royal government totaled approximately 860,000 livres tournois, equivalent to 46 tonnes of silver. Overall revenues were about twice the ordinary revenues. Some 30% of the revenues were collected from the royal demesne. The royal financial administration employed perhaps 3,000 people, of which about 1,000 were officials in the proper sense. After assuming the throne, Philip inherited a sizable debt from his father's war against Aragon. By November 1286 it reached 8 tonnes of silver to his primary financiers, the Templars, equivalent to 17% of government revenue. This debt was quickly paid off, and, in 1287 and 1288, Philip's kingdom ran a budget surplus.

After 1289, a decline in Saxony's silver production, combined with Philip's wars against Aragon, England and Flanders, drove the French government to fiscal deficits. The war against Aragon, inherited from Philip's father, required the expenditure of 1.5 million LT (livres tournois) and the 1294–99 war against England over Gascony another 1.73 million LT. Loans from the Aragonese War were still being paid back in 1306. 

To cover the deficit, Pope Nicholas IV in 1289 granted Philip permission to collect a tithe of 152,000 LP (livres parisis) from the Church lands in France. With revenues of 1.52 million LP, the church in France had greater fiscal resources than the royal government, whose ordinary revenues in 1289 amounted to 595,318 LP and overall revenues to 1.2 million LP. By November 1290, the deficit stood at 6% of revenues. In 1291 the budget swung back into surplus only to fall into deficit again in 1292.

The constant deficits led Philip to order the arrest of the Lombard merchants, who had earlier made him extensive loans on the pledge of repayment from future taxation. The Lombards' assets were seized by government agents and the crown extracted 250,000 LT by forcing the Lombards to purchase French nationality. Despite this draconian measure, the deficits continued to stack up in 1293. By 1295, Philip had replaced the Templars with the Florentine Franzesi bankers as his main source of finance. The Italians could raise huge loans far beyond the capacities of the Templars, and Philip came to rely on them more and more. The royal treasure was transferred from the Paris Temple to the Louvre around this time.

Devaluation

In 1294, France went to war against England and in 1297, Flanders declared its independence from France. By 1295, to pay for his constant wars, Philip had no choice but to borrow more and debase the currency by reducing its silver content. This led to the virtual disappearance of silver from France by 1301. Currency depreciation provided the crown with 1.419 million LP from November 1296 to Christmas 1299, more than enough to cover war costs of 1.066 million LP in the same period.

The devaluation was socially devastating. It was accompanied by dramatic inflation that damaged the real incomes of the creditors such as the aristocracy and the Church, who received a weaker currency in return for the loans they had issued in a stronger currency. The indebted lower classes did not benefit from the devaluation, as the high inflation ate into the purchasing power of their money. The result was social unrest. By 22 August 1303 this practice led to a two-thirds loss in the value of the livres, sous and deniers in circulation.

The defeat at the battle of Golden Spurs in 1302 was a crushing blow to French finance, reducing the value of the French currency by 37% in the 15 months that followed. The royal government had to order officials and subjects to provide all or half, respectively, of their silver vessels for minting into coins. New taxes were levied to pay for the deficit. As people attempted to move their wealth out of the country in non-monetary form, Philip banned merchandise exports without royal approval. The king obtained another crusade tithe from the pope and returned the royal treasure to the Temple to gain the Templars as his creditors again.

Revaluation
After bringing the Flemish War to a victorious conclusion in 1305, Philip on 8 June 1306 ordered the silver content of new coinage to be raised back to its 1285 level of 3.96 grams of silver per livre. To harmonize the strength of the old and new currencies, the debased coinage of 1303 was devalued accordingly by two-thirds. The debtors were driven to penury by the need to repay their loans in the new, strong currency. This led to rioting in Paris on 30 December 1306, forcing Philip to briefly seek refuge in the Paris Temple, the headquarters of the Knights Templar.

Perhaps seeking to control the silver of the Jewish mints to put the revaluation to effect, Philip ordered the expulsion of the Jews on 22 July 1306 and confiscated their property on 23 August, collecting at least 140,000 LP with this measure. With the Jews gone, Philip appointed royal guardians to collect the loans made by the Jews, and the money was passed to the Crown. After Philip, in 1315, the Jews were invited back with an offer of 12 years of guaranteed residence, free from government interference. In 1322, the Jews were expelled again by the King's successor.

When Philip levied taxes on the French clergy of one half their annual income, he caused an uproar within the Catholic Church and the papacy, prompting Pope Boniface VIII to issue the bull Clericis Laicos (1296), forbidding the transference of any church property to the French Crown. Philip retaliated by forbidding the removal of bullion from France. By 1297, Boniface agreed to Philip's taxation of the clergy in emergencies.

In 1301, Philip had the bishop of Pamier arrested for treason. Boniface called French bishops to Rome to discuss Philip's actions. In response, Philip convoked an assembly of bishops, nobles and grand bourgeois of Paris in order to condemn the Pope. This precursor to the Estates General appeared for the first time during his reign, a measure of the professionalism and order that his ministers were introducing into government. This assembly, which was composed of clergy, nobles, and burghers, gave support to Philip. 

Boniface retaliated with the celebrated bull Unam Sanctam (1302), a declaration of papal supremacy. Philip gained a victory, after having sent his agent Guillaume de Nogaret to arrest Boniface at Anagni. The pope escaped but died soon afterward. The French archbishop Bertrand de Goth was elected pope as Clement V and thus began the so-called Babylonian Captivity of the papacy (1309–76), during which the official seat of the papacy moved to Avignon, an enclave surrounded by French territories, and was subjected to French control.

Suppression of the Knights Templar

Philip was substantially in debt to the Knights Templar, a monastic military order whose original role as protectors of Christian pilgrims in the Latin East had been largely replaced by banking and other commercial activities by the end of the 13th century. As the popularity of the Crusades had decreased, support for the military orders had waned, and Philip used a disgruntled complaint against the Knights Templar as an excuse to move against the entire organization as it existed in France, in part to free himself from his debts. Other motives appear to have included concern over perceived heresy,  assertion of French control over a weakened Papacy, and finally, the substitution of royal officials for officers of the Temple in the financial management of French government. 

Recent studies emphasize the political and religious motivations of Philip the Fair and his ministers (especially Guillaume de Nogaret). It seems that, with the "discovery" and repression of the "Templars' heresy", the Capetian monarchy claimed for itself the mystic foundations of the papal theocracy. The Temple case was the last step of a process of appropriating these foundations, which had begun with the Franco-papal rift at the time of Boniface VIII. Being the ultimate defender of the Catholic faith, the Capetian king was invested with a Christ-like function that put him above the pope. What was at stake in the Templars' trial, then, was the establishment of a "royal theocracy".

At daybreak on Friday, 13 October 1307, hundreds of Templars in France were simultaneously arrested by agents of Philip the Fair, to be later tortured into admitting heresy in the Order. The Templars were supposedly answerable only to the Pope, but Philip used his influence over Clement V, who was largely his pawn, to disband the organization. Pope Clement did attempt to hold proper trials, but Philip used the previously forced confessions to have many Templars burned at the stake before they could mount a proper defence.

In March 1314, Philip had Jacques de Molay, the last Grand Master of the Temple, and Geoffroi de Charney, Preceptor of Normandy, burned at the stake. An account of the event goes as follows:

After a little over a month, Pope Clement V died of disease thought to be lupus, and in eight months Philip IV, at the age of forty-six, died in a hunting accident. This gave rise to the legend that de Molay had cited them before the tribunal of God, which became popular among the French population. Even in Germany, Philip's death was spoken of as a retribution for his destruction of the Templars, and Clement was described as shedding tears of remorse on his death-bed for three great crimes: the poisoning of Henry VII, Holy Roman Emperor, and the ruin of the Templars and Beguines. Within fourteen years the throne passed rapidly through Philip's sons, who died relatively young, and without producing male heirs. By 1328, his male line was extinguished, and the throne had passed to the line of his brother, the House of Valois.

Tour de Nesle affair
In 1314, the daughters-in-law of Philip IV, Margaret of Burgundy (wife of Louis X) and Blanche of Burgundy (wife of Charles IV) were accused of adultery, and their alleged lovers (Phillipe d'Aunay and Gauthier d'Aunay) tortured, flayed and executed in what has come to be known as the Tour de Nesle affair. A third daughter-in-law, Joan II, Countess of Burgundy (wife of Philip V), was accused of knowledge of the affairs.

Death

Philip suffered a cerebral stroke during a hunt at Pont-Sainte-Maxence (Forest of Halatte), and died a few weeks later, on 29 November 1314, at Fontainebleau. He is buried in the Basilica of St Denis. Philip was succeeded by his son Louis X.

Issue

The children of Philip IV of France and Joan I of Navarre were:
 Margaret (ca. 1288, Paris – d. 1300, Paris). Died in childhood, betrothed to Infante Ferdinand of Castile
 Louis X (4 October 1289 – 5 June 1316)
 Blanche (1290, Paris – after 13 April 1294, Saint Denis). Died in childhood, but betrothed in December 1291 (aged one) to Infante Ferdinand of Castile, later Ferdinand IV of Castile. Blanche was buried in the Basilica of St Denis.
 Philip V (c.1291 – 3 January 1322)
 Charles IV (1294 – 1 February 1328)
 Isabella (c. 1295 – 23 August 1358). Married Edward II of England and was the mother of Edward III of England.
 Robert (1296, Paris – August 1308, Saint Germain-en-Laye). The Flores historiarum of Bernard Guidonis names "Robertum" as youngest of the four sons of Philip IV of France, adding that he died "in flore adolescentiæ suæ" ("in the flower of youth") and was buried "in monasterio sororum de Pyssiaco" ("in the monastery of the Sisters of Pyssiaco") in August 1308. Betrothed in October 1306 (aged ten) to Constance of Sicily.

All three of Philip's sons who reached adulthood became kings of France, and Isabella, his only surviving daughter, was the queen of England as consort to Edward II of England.

In fiction
Dante Alighieri often refers to Philip in La Divina Commedia, never by name but as the "mal di Francia" (plague of France). It is possible that Dante hides further the person of the king behind 7 figures: Cerbero, Pluto, Filippo Argenti (Philippe de l'argent), Capaneo, Gerione, Nembrot, in the Inferno, and the Giant in the Purgatorio killed by the "515". These representations are centered around Capaneo, referring to the myth of the Seven against Thebes, and are related to the Beast from the Sea in the Revelation of St. John, whose seventh head, like the Giant, is also killed. Such a scheme is related to the transposition of the Revelation in the history, according to the ideas of Joachim of Fiore.

Philip is the title character in Le Roi de fer (The Iron King), the 1955 first novel in Les Rois maudits (The Accursed Kings), a series of French historical novels by Maurice Druon. The six following volumes in the series follow the descendants of Philip, including sons Louis X and Philip V, as well as daughter Isabella of France. He was portrayed by Georges Marchal in the 1972 French miniseries adaptation of the series, and by Tchéky Karyo in the 2005 adaptation.

In the 2017 television series Knightfall, Philip is portrayed by Ed Stoppard.

Notes

References

Sources

Further reading

 
 
 
 
 

|-

 
1268 births
1314 deaths
13th-century kings of France
14th-century kings of France
13th-century Navarrese monarchs
14th-century Navarrese monarchs
Antisemitism in France
Burials at the Basilica of Saint-Denis
Deaths by horse-riding accident in France
French Roman Catholics
House of Capet
Hunting accident deaths
Jure uxoris kings
Navarrese monarchs
People temporarily excommunicated by the Catholic Church
People from Fontainebleau
People of the War of the Sicilian Vespers
Sons of kings